Anne Vaughan, Countess of Carbery (née Saville; 1663 – c. January 1690) was a daughter of George Savile, 1st Marquess of Halifax, and his first wife, Lady Dorothy Spencer.

On 10 August 1682, she married, as his second wife, John Vaughan, 3rd Earl of Carbery. Their only son, George Vaughan, died in 1685, aged two.  Their only surviving child was a daughter, Lady Anne Vaughan, who became the wife of Charles Powlett, 3rd Duke of Bolton.

The countess died following the birth of her daughter and was buried in the churchyard of St Andrew Holborn.

References

External links
 thePeerage.com

1663 births
1690 deaths
Irish countesses
Daughters of British marquesses
Deaths in childbirth